Mount Baird ( is located in the Snake River Range, Caribou-Targhee National Forest, in the U.S. state of Idaho. Mount Baird is the tallest peak in the Snake River Range as well as in Bonneville County, Idaho.

References

Baird
Landforms of Bonneville County, Idaho